Anne Lacey (born 1958) is a Scottish actress who has appeared in television series, made-for-television movies, and film shorts since 1986.  Her longest appearance run to date has been in 20 episodes of the TV series Hamish Macbeth from 1995-1997 as schoolteacher Esme Murray.

She trained in Scotland, France and Italy.

Her theatre work includes The Pearl Fishers, Men Should Weep, The House with the Green Shutters, and The Cone Gatherers.  She has worked with the Royal Shakespeare Company, the Dundee Repertory Theatre, the National Theatre of Scotland and the Oxford Stage Company.

Her work in film includes Harry Potter and the Goblet of Fire, My Life So Far, and Strictly Sinatra.

Her television work in addition to Hamish Macbeth includes Monarch of the Glen, Holby City, Doctor Finlay, and Rab C. Nesbitt.

References

External links

Living people
Scottish film actresses
Scottish television actresses
1958 births